Porrerus is a genus of antlions belonging to the family Myrmeleontidae.

The species of this genus are found in Caribbean.

Species:

Porrerus dealbatus 
Porrerus dominicanus 
Porrerus famelicus

References

Myrmeleontidae genera
Myrmeleontinae